Elisabeth Rethberg ( Lisbeth Sättler; 22 September 1894 – 6 June 1976) was a German operatic soprano singer who was active from the period of the First World War through the early 1940s.

Early years
Rethberg was born Lisbeth Sättler in Schwarzenberg. She studied at the Dresden Royal Conservatory with Otto Watrin. She made her operatic debut in Dresden opposite Richard Tauber on 16 June 1915, as Arsena in the operetta Der Zigeunerbaron by Johann Strauss II. She later studied singing with Estelle Liebling in New York City.

Career 

Rethberg sang with the Dresden Opera until 1922, when she made her Metropolitan Opera debut as Aida in Giuseppe Verdi's opera of that name. She moved to the USA and remained with the Metropolitan Opera for 20 seasons, singing 30 roles on stage. Her four Met opening nights (Die Walküre, Marriage of Figaro and two times Aida) tie her with Licia Albanese as the soprano awarded the most Met opening nights. She also was engaged by London's Royal Opera House, Covent Garden, where she sang in 1925 and from 1934–1939. She sang for the Salzburg Festival in Austria, to audiences in Milan and elsewhere in Europe.

Rethberg often returned to Dresden. In 1928, she created the title role in Richard Strauss's Die ägyptische Helena. During the latter half of the 1930s, Rethberg's voice lost some of its luster, which some attribute to her frequent singing of Aida and other heavier roles. She retired from the stage in 1942.

She made recordings of arias and ensemble pieces in Germany and the United States between 1921 and the outbreak of the Second World War. Many of these are available on LP and CD transfers.

The most notable records of her art include live Metropolitan Opera recordings of her role in the complete operas by Mozart, Verdi and Wagner. These records include Mozart's Marriage of Figaro, Verdi's Simon Boccanegra and Otello, and Wagner's Lohengrin. Concerning her lieder discography, she was included in the 1930s Hugo Wolf Society recording project (e.g. "Müh'voll komm' ich und beladen").

Rethberg had a distinctive lyrical but focused voice felt to be at once extremely feminine and penetrating. Though her voice was not then at its prime, she is heard to greatest effect in live recordings later in her career of Lohengrin opposite Melchior, Otello opposite Martinelli and Tibbett, and Simon Boccanegra opposite Martinelli and Tibbett as well. Only a few measures exist of her Leonora in Il trovatore opposite Martinelli and Bonelli. No full recordings exist of her most famous role, Aida, though she recorded many extracts from it in the studio. A combination of live performances and studio recordings remain of her rendition of Amelia from Un Ballo in Maschera, and these possibly best illustrate the combined lyric and dramatic potential of her voice.

Personal life 

Rethberg was initially married to Ernst Albert Dormann. In 1956, she married the Russian-born Met comprimario singer George Cehanovsky.

References

External links

Biography and discography from Cantabile-Subito.de

1894 births
1976 deaths
German operatic sopranos
Hochschule für Musik Carl Maria von Weber alumni
20th-century German women opera singers